Jinjing Road is a station on Line 12 of the Shanghai Metro  in the Pudong New Area of Shanghai. It is located on the junction of Jufeng Road and Jinjing Road.

Railway stations in Shanghai
Line 12, Shanghai Metro
Shanghai Metro stations in Pudong
Railway stations in China opened in 2013